Cernat may refer to several places in Romania:

 Cernat, a commune in Covasna County
 Cernat, a village in Sopot Commune, Dolj County
 Cernatu, a former village in Brașov County, now part of Săcele city
 Cernat (Bâsca), a tributary of the Bâsca in Buzău County
 Cernat, a tributary of the Durbav in Brașov County
 Cernat, another name for the Mărcușa, a tributary of the Râul Negru in Covasna County
 Cernat (Râul Doamnei), a tributary of the Râul Doamnei in Argeș County

Other 
 Cernat (surname)

See also 
 Cerna (disambiguation)